Leonard John McGrath (1899 – December 1949) was an Irish dual player who played both football and hurling for Galway.

Born in Charters Towers, Queensland, Australia, McGrath came to Galway with his family in his youth. He made his first impression on the inter-county scene when he was a member of the Galway senior hurling team for the 1923 championship. McGrath won an All-Ireland medal that year as Galway secured their first hurling title. Two years later he won an All-Ireland medal with the Galway senior football team.

At club level McGrath played with Mullagh and St Grellan's.

He also played rugby, which earned him an expulsion from the GAA under Rule 27.

His medal collection was auctioned in 2020.

References

1899 births
1949 deaths
Australian farmers
Australian Gaelic footballers
Australian hurlers
Irish people of Australian descent
Dual players
Gaelic footballers who switched code
Galway inter-county hurlers
Galway inter-county Gaelic footballers
Irish farmers
Mullagh hurlers
St Grellan's Gaelic footballers